Nikah mut'ah , literally "pleasure marriage"; temporary marriage or Sigheh is a private and verbal temporary marriage contract that is practiced in Twelver Shia Islam in which the duration of the marriage and the mahr must be specified and agreed upon in advance. It is a private contract made in a verbal or written format. A declaration of the intent to marry and an acceptance of the terms are required as in other forms of marriage in Islam.

According to Shia Muslims, Muhammad sanctioned nikah mut'ah (fixed-term marriage, called muta'a in Iraq and sigheh in Iran), which has instead been used as a legitimizing cover for sex workers in a culture where prostitution is otherwise forbidden. Some Western writers have argued that mut'ah approximates prostitution.

Some sources say the Nikah mut'ah has no prescribed minimum or maximum duration, but others, such as The Oxford Dictionary of Islam, indicate the minimum duration of the marriage is debatable and durations of at least three days, three months or one year have been suggested.

Some Muslims and Western scholars have stated that both Nikah mut'ah and Nikah misyar are Islamically void attempts to religiously sanction prostitution which is otherwise forbidden. The Zaidi Shia reject Mutah marriage.

Background 
Historically there were many types of marriages, used for various purposes, as opposed to a full marriage; in mut'ah some of the rights of the husband and wife are non-existent. This was primarily used by those who could not stay at home with their wife and traveled a lot. For example, a traveling merchant might arrive at a town and stay for a few months, in that period he may marry a divorced widow, and they would take care of each other. When he has to leave to the next down, the marriage is over, and he might sign a mut'ah contract at his next place. Although in modern times such a thing is considered obsolete, due to the availability of fast travel, and primarily exists in Iran and Shia regions for sexual pleasure reasons as a means of Halal dating.

Mut'ah, literally meaning joy, is a condition where rules of Islam are relaxed. It can apply to marriage (the nikah mut'ah) or to the Hajj (the obligatory pilgrimage) (the Mut'ah of Hajj). The permissibility of Mut'ah is disputed by majority of the Sunni scholars, who argue that the practice was banished by the Prophet. Twelver Shia scholars, on the other hand, assert that Mut'ah was sanctioned by the Prophet, but was banished by the Second Caliph 'Umar. Omar's abolition was not accepted in many scholarly circles and was met with staunch opposition from major companions like 'Imràn b. Husayn, Ibn 'Abbas, as well as Omar's son 'Abd Allàh b. 'Umar. Both Shias and Sunnis agree that, initially, or near the beginning of Islam, Nikah mut'ah was a legal contract.

The prominent companion and Caliph Abd Allah ibn al-Zubayr was born of nikah mut'ah between Zubayr ibn al-Awwam and Asma bint Abi Bakr. According to al-Raghib al-Isphahani, Abu Dawood al-Tayalisi, and Qadhi Sanaullah Panipati, were major scholarly personalities born of Mut'ah.

Religious views

Twelver Shia 
According to Twelver Shia jurisprudence, preconditions for mut'ah are: The bride must not be married, she must attain the permission of her wali if she has never been married before, she must be Muslim or belong to Ahl al-Kitab (People of the Book), she should be chaste, must not be a known adulterer, and she can only independently do this if she is Islamically a non-virgin or she has no wali (Islamic legal guardian). At the end of the contract, the marriage ends and the wife must undergo iddah, a period of abstinence from marriage (and thus, sexual intercourse). The iddah is intended to give paternal certainty to any children should the wife become pregnant during the temporary marriage contract.
The Twelver Shias give arguments based on the Quran, hadith (religious narration), history, and moral grounds to support their position on mut'ah. They argue that the word of the Qur'an takes precedence over that of any other scripture, including Quran 4:24, known as the verse of Mut'ah.

Julie Parshall writes that mut'ah is legalised prostitution which has been sanctioned by the Twelver Shia authorities. She quotes the Oxford Encyclopedia of the Modern Islamic World to differentiate between marriage (nikah) and Mut'ah, and states that while nikah is for procreation, mut'ah is just for sexual gratification. According to Zeyno Baran, this kind of temporary marriage provides Shi'ite men with a religiously sanctioned equivalent to prostitution. According to Elena Andreeva's observation published in 2007, Russian travelers to Iran consider mut'ah to be "legalized profligacy", which is indistinguishable from prostitution. These views are contested by others, who hold that mut'ah is a temporary wedlock option in Islam for avoiding illegal sex relations among those Muslims whose marriage is legitimate but, for certain constraints, they are unable to avail it. From this point of view, mut'ah is neither concubinage nor prostitution. Religious supporters of mut'ah argue that temporary marriage is different from prostitution for a couple of reasons, including the necessity of iddah in case the couple have sexual intercourse. According to this interpretation of the rules of iddah, if a woman marries a man in this way and has sex, she has to wait a number of months before marrying again and therefore, a woman cannot marry more than three or four times in a year.

Sunni 
During the sixteenth century, during the reign of Akbar, the third emperor of the Mughal Empire, who was believed to be a Hanafi Sunni, debates on religious matters were held weekly on Thursdays. When discussing nikah mut'ah, Shi'ite theologians argued that the historic Sunni scholar Malik ibn Anas supported the practice. However, the evidence from Malik's Muwatta (manual of religious jurisprudence) was not forthcoming. The Shi'ite theologians persisted and nikah mut'ah was legalized for the Twelver Shia during Akbar's reign. According to Sunni Arab jurisdiction of Jordan; if the nikah mut'ah meets all other requirements, it is treated as if it were a permanent marriage.

The thirteenth century scholar, Fakhr al-Din al-Razi said,

Amongst the Ummah there are many great scholars who deem Mut'ah to have been abrogated, whilst others say that Mut'ah still remains.

The Gharab al Quran, the dictionary of Qur'anic terms states,

The people of Faith are in agreement that Mut'ah is halal, then a great man said Mut'ah was abrogated, other than them remaining scholars, including the Shi'a believe Mut'ah remain halaal in the same way it was in the past. Ibn Abbas held this viewpoint and Imran bin Husain.

De facto temporary marriages were conducted by Sunnis by not specifying how long the marriage would last in the written documents themselves while orally agreeing to set a fixed period.

Even though nikah mut'ah is prohibited by the four Sunni madh'habs (legal schools of law), several types of innovative marriage exist, including misyar (ambulant) and ʿurfi (customary) marriage; however these are distinct from the Twelver Shia understanding. Some regard misyar as being comparable to nikah mut'ah: for the sole purpose of "sexual gratification in a licit manner". In Ba'athist Iraq, Uday Hussein's daily newspaper Babil, which at one point referred to the Shi'ites as "rafidah", a sectarian epithet for Shia, condemned Wahhabi clerics as hypocrites for endorsing Misyar while denouncing Mut'ah.

According to classical Sunni scholars such as Ibn Hazm (384 - 456 A.H / 994 - 1064 C.E), Ibn Hajar al-Athqallani (773 - 852 A.H / 1372 - 1449 C.E), etc.; numerous prominent companions continued to believe in the permissibility of practising Mut'ah after the death of the Prophet. Early Sunni hadith scholars such as `Ata' ibn Abi Rabah, Ibn Jurayj, Ahmad ibn Hanbal etc. deemed Mut'ah marriages valid and permissible. Yemeni scholar Al-Shawkani (1759 CE /1173 AH - 1839 CE /1255 AH); reported in Nayl al-Awtar that the influential Sunni Mufassir Ibn Jarir al-Tabari (839–923 CE / 224–310 AH) held the same view. Some Sunnite scholars narrated that Malik ibn Anas and Al-Shafi'i sanctioned temporary marriages.

According to prominent Indian Salafi scholar Waheed ud-Deen Zaman:"On the topic of Mut'ah, differences have arisen amongst the Sahaba, and the Ahl al-Hadith, and they deemed Mut'ah to be permissible, since Mut'ah under the Shari'ah was practiced and this is proven, and as evidence of permissibility they cite verse 24 of Surah Nisa as proof. The practice of Mut'ah is definite and there is ijma (consensus) on this and you can not refute definite proof by using logic."

Western views
Some Western writers have argued that mut'ah approximates prostitution, and asserted that it has been used to cover for child prostitution. Julie Parshall writes that mut'ah is legalised prostitution which has been sanctioned by the Twelver Shia authorities. She quotes the Oxford encyclopedia of modern Islamic world to differentiate between marriage (nikah) and Mut'ah, and states that while nikah is for procreation, mut'ah is just for sexual gratification.

In popular culture 
The Girl Sitting Here is a (2021) short film directed by Azadeh Nikzadeh about a temporary marriage contract. Bahar (Bahar Beihaghi) a young woman, in exchange for funds to cover the costs of a surgery negotiates a temporary marriage deal with Mr. Payam (Neimah Djourabchi).

See also 

 Criticism of Twelver Shia Islam
 Islamic marital jurisprudence
 Jihad al-nikah
 Marriage of convenience
 Nikah Halala
 Nikah Misyar
 Pilegesh
 Walking marriage

References

Notes

Citations

Further reading

 
Islamic terminology
Marriage in Islam
Marriage, unions and partnerships in Iran